Rosenska Pokalen 1901, part of the 1901 Swedish football season, was the third Rosenska Pokalen tournament played. Eight teams participated and seven matches were played, the first 11 August 1901 and the last 1 September 1901. No team was declared winners of the tournament.

Participating clubs

Tournament results 
1st round

1st round B

Semi-finals

Final

Notes

References 

Print

1901
Ros